Alissa Quart (born 1972) is an American nonfiction writer, critic, journalist, editor, and poet. Her nonfiction books are Republic of Outsiders: The Power of Amateurs, Dreamers and Rebels (2013), Hothouse Kids: The Dilemma of the Gifted Child (2007), Branded: The Buying and Selling of Teenagers (2003), Squeezed: Why Our Families Can't Afford America (2018), and Bootstrapped: Liberating Ourselves from the American Dream (2023); her poetry books are Monetized (2015) and Thoughts and Prayers (2019).

Her multimedia story with Maisie Crow, "The Last Clinic" was nominated for a National Magazine Award and a Documentary Emmy in 2014. She was Executive Producer of the film "Jackson" that won an Emmy for Best Documentary, Social Issue. She is Executive Director of the Economic Hardship Reporting Project, founded by Barbara Ehrenreich. Quart's articles and reviews have appeared in The New York Times, The Guardian,The Atlantic, and many other publications and she has appeared on Nightline, 20/20, the Today Show, CNN, CBC, and C-Span. She coined the term hyperlink cinema in 2005.

She has taught at Brown University and Columbia University's Graduate School of Journalism, and is a 2010 Nieman Fellowship recipient.

Early life and education
Born to two college professors, she grew up in lower Manhattan, attending Stuyvesant High School. She received a BA in English Literature with Honors in Creative Writing from Brown University in 1994 then did graduate work in English Literature for a year at CUNY Graduate Center before completing a Master of Science at Columbia Graduate School of Journalism in 1997.

Books (Nonfiction)

Branded (2003) 
In 2003 she published Branded: The Buying and Selling of Teenagers which illustrates and criticizes the way that corporations chase teenagers and pre-teens. From the annual Advertising & Promotion to Kids Conference to affiliate programs by catalog retailers such as Delia's that have teenagers advise their friends on what is desirable to Disney and McDonald's holding focus groups in high schools, Quart shows how companies have become increasingly sophisticated in hooking youngsters into a world of extreme consumerism that is ultimately harmful to them socially and developmentally. She points out that companies trap these impressionable individuals "into a cycle of labor and shopping" with brands "aim[ing] to register so strongly in kids' minds that the appeal will remain for life".

The book received generally favorable reviews. Publishers Weekly gave it a starred review calling it a "substantive follow-up to Naomi Klein's No Logo". It received consistent praise for its analysis from other sources such as The New York Times, The Nation, and the book industry monthly Bookpage.

Branded has been translated into French, German, Spanish, Italian, Japanese, and Finnish.

Hothouse Kids (2006)
She published Hothouse Kids: The Dilemma of the Gifted Child, a book that examines the cultures of extreme child-rearing that can be found across the U.S. that puts heavy emphasis on early achievement. Quart turns a skeptical eye on the growing genius-building business that includes the Baby Einstein videos, the Scripps National Spelling Bee, and IQ tests. In a book that Publishers Weekly called "first class literary journalism," she paints a somber picture of what the life of a child prodigy really looks like.

Hothouse Kids has been published in South Korea and the UK.

Republic of Outsiders (2013)
Republic of Outsiders: The Power of Amateurs, Dreamers and Rebels (2013), describes the role of cultural outsiders who are importantly changing elements of mainstream US culture via new technologies and entrepreneurialism. In a book that Publishers Weekly called "thoroughly researched and admirably evenhanded," Quart reports on self-advocacy among people with schizophrenia, bipolar disorder and other mental illnesses that are usually treated with drugs. Instead of allowing doctors to define them, these people espouse “mad pride” and create online communities where peer counseling replaces institutionalization. Quart's point is that all are examples of "counterpublics" who crucially re-form what is considered acceptable, allowing further diversity of options. She ends with a powerful example of Occupy Bank Working Group, or an offshoot of Occupy Wall Street headed by an ex-banker whose goals include to make a nonpredatory credit card for the needy.

In addition to the starred review from Publishers Weekly, the book was reviewed in the Times which Quart's skill in reporting on "the experiences of ordinary people, following their realistically messy lives for year, offering us vivid portraits that are profoundly humane". The book, which was included in the "brilliant" "high brow" quadrant of New York magazine's Approval Matrix, was excerpted in O magazine's August 2013 issue.

Squeezed: Why Our Families Can't Afford America (2018)

Published in June 2018, Squeezed: Why Our Families Can't Afford America, "brings together original research and reporting to investigate how the high costs of American parenthood have bankrupted the middle class, and examines solutions that might help families across the country". It was reviewed favorably twice by The New York Times, was featured by Terry Gross's Fresh Air, and was chosen as one of C-SPAN's books of the year.

Bootstrapped: Liberating Ourselves from the American Dream (2023)

Alissa's latest nonfiction book is Bootstrapped: Liberating Ourselves from the American Dream, "an unsparing... yet ultimately hopeful look at how we can shed the American obsession with self-reliance that has made us less healthy, less secure, and less fulfilled." Literary Hub called Bootstrapped one of the "most anticipated books of 2023." A starred review by Publishers Weekly said, "Quart’s vision of an America where no one needs to put on 'codified theatrical performances via social media' to get the help they need is a breath of fresh air. This eloquent and incisive call to action inspires.” Bootstrapped has been reviewed favorably by The Atlantic, Kirkus Reviews, Jacobin, and People magazine, with excerpts featured in The New York Times, TIME, and The Washington Post.

Magazine, news and multimedia work

She coined the term hyperlink cinema in 2005 in a review of the film Happy Endings for Film Comment. In the article, she underscored director Don Roos's use of connecting scenes through happenstance, and linking text and captions under or next to a split-screen image. Other films that she includes under this term: The Opposite of Sex, Magnolia, Time Code, and Paul Haggis's Crash, and the TV series 24. Hyperlink cinema was further popularized by Roger Ebert in his review of Syriana the same year.

Her work for The New York Times Magazine includes a feature on the indie music scene in Toronto, a story about a transmale college freshman at Barnard.

Quart commissioned and helped originate Maisie Crow's 50-minute documentary about the Jackson Women's Health Organization, the last abortion clinic in Mississippi, writing its National Magazine Award-nominated multimedia story for the Atavist.

Quart is the executive director of the Economic Hardship Reporting Project, a nonprofit organization that funds independent reporters covering social inequality and economic justice. The organization was founded by Barbara Ehrenreich in 2012.

Poetry
Quart was a poet before she became a journalist. Her poetry has been published by the London Review of Books, the Los Angeles Review of Books, and news and culture website the Awl, among other places: In 2002, she came out with a chapbook, Solarized, a lyrically and sonically complex work that shares the thematic preoccupations of her journalism: commercialism, gender identity and being a young woman, gentrification, 1970s and indie film, advertising, adolescence, and bad tourism. Of her writing process, she said in 2014:

Monetized (2015)
Monetized is her collection of poetry that reflects on consumer identities, Internet culture, gentrification, and "belatedness". Some of the poetry is autobiographical, two are responses to poems by Wallace Stevens. The book was well received by critics, and included in The New York Observer'''s "Innovation" section and covered by The New Yorker, with Joshua Rothman describing it as "dense, playful, aphoristic." The review in Publishers Weekly praised Quart for "her keen sociological eye" and "remarkably apt cultural critiques". Alternet's Lynn Stuart Parramore wrote, "Quart’s laser-sharp phrases...have a way of sticking around in your head long after you turn the final page.”

Awards
 Nieman Fellowship, 2010
 Pulitzer Center on Crisis Reporting grant, 2013

Personal life
She is married to Peter Maass, a journalist, and they live in New York City.

Published works

Poetry
 Solarized (2002, chapbook)
 Monetized (2015)
 Thoughts and Prayers (2019)

Nonfiction
 Branded: The Buying and Selling of Teenagers (2003)
 Hothouse Kids: The Dilemma of the Gifted Child (2007)
 Republic of Outsiders: The Power of Amateurs, Dreamers and Rebels (2013)
 Squeezed: Why Our Families Can't Afford America'' (2018)

References

External links 

 

Living people
Brown University alumni
Columbia University Graduate School of Journalism alumni
American women poets
American feminist writers
American women journalists
Jewish American writers
Writers from Manhattan
The Nation (U.S. magazine) people
1972 births
20th-century American poets
21st-century American poets
20th-century American women writers
21st-century American women writers
Journalists from New York City
20th-century American non-fiction writers
21st-century American non-fiction writers
Stuyvesant High School alumni
21st-century American Jews
Electronic literature writers